Radial Road 10, more commonly referred to as R-10, is a planned network of roads and bridges that all together would form the tenth radial road of Manila in the Philippines. It is the westernmost of the radial roads north of the Pasig River running north–south close to the shoreline of Manila Bay. When completed, the road would link the City of Manila with Navotas, and the northern coastal provinces of Bulacan, Pampanga, and Bataan in Central Luzon.

At present, only the Manila–Navotas segment of the road is complete.

Route
From south to north, the road consists of the following segments:

Mel Lopez Boulevard

Between Mel Lopez Bridge (also known as Delpan Bridge and Roxas Bridge) over the Pasig River and the Maralla Bridge over the Marala Creek (Sunog Apog Creek), R-10 is known as Mel Lopez Boulevard, formerly Marcos Road. It is the only segment of R-10 in the City of Manila which passes through the Manila North Harbor complex in Tondo before arriving in the city of Navotas where it continues simply as R-10.

Radial Road 10
North of the Estero de Marala, R-10 serves the Navotas Fish Port Complex and terminates at the Bangkulasi Bridge over the Tullahan River, where it continues towards South Caloocan and Quezon City as Circumferential Road 4 (C-4).

Manila–Bataan Coastal Road
A highway linking Manila and the province of Bataan has been proposed as an extension of R-10. Similar to Radial Road 1 and its segments, Roxas Boulevard and the Manila–Cavite Expressway, the highway would run along the coast of Manila Bay north of the Pasig River. From the current terminus of R-10 in Navotas, Phase 1 will travel north along the coastal Bulacan municipalities and end at the proposed North Luzon Expressway (NLEX) Phase 3 in Bacolor, Pampanga, while Phase 2 would travel south from NLEX Phase 3 in Lubao, Pampanga to Balanga, Bataan. The proposed highway would be built over fishponds and would also serve as flood barriers for the coastal provinces.

See also
 List of roads in Metro Manila

References

Routes in Metro Manila